Jiří Sýkora may refer to:

 Jiří Sýkora (decathlete) (born 1995), Czech athlete
 Jiří Sýkora (footballer) (born 1977), Czech footballer
 Jiří Sýkora (runner) (born 1954), Czech long-distance runner